Cevizli is a quarter (mahalle) of Trikomo in Northern Cyprus. De jure, Trikomo is part of Cyprus.

References

Populated places in İskele District